Phospholipid scramblase family member 5 is a protein that in humans is encoded by the PLSCR5 gene.

See also 
 scramblase

References

Further reading